Grávido is a 1984 album by the Brazilian composer and singer Luiz Gonzaga Jr., better known as Gonzaguinha. It is considered an album of the maturity period of the artist and counts on the arrangements of Jota Moraes. It includes the hits "Lindo lago do amor" and "Rosa povo".

Track listing

Personnel
Gonzaguinha: vocals and acoustic guitar (in "Lindo lago do amor" and "Days after that day").
Jota Moraes: arrangement (except in "Sonhos brasis")
Pascoal Meirelles: arrangement (in "Nem o pobre nem o rei")
Wagner Tiso: arrangement (in "Sonhos brasis")

References

1984 albums
Gonzaguinha albums